Santo Condestável (English: the Saint Constable) is a former parish (freguesia) in the municipality of Lisbon, Portugal. At the administrative reorganization of Lisbon on 8 December 2012 it became part of the parish Campo de Ourique.

Main sites
Santo Condestável Church

References 

Former parishes of Lisbon